Orly Weinerman (born 21 June 1971) is an Israeli actress, model and singer.

Weinerman was a member of the cast of Shemesh, an Israeli situation comedy. After Shemesh, Weinerman moved to London where she attempted to make a career in modelling and advance her acting career. Returning to Israel, Weinerman appeared at the Beauty City beauty fair.

In 2006, the German newspaper Der Spiegel , the Spanish newspaper La Voz de Galicia and the AP Archive Interview reported that Weinerman was romantically linked to Saif al-Islam Gaddafi, son of the then Libyan leader Muammar Gaddafi. Weinerman initially publicly denied having any contact with Saif al-Islam. In 2012, she said that she considered marriage with Saif Gaddafi and that "everything should be done" to save him from death.

Filmography
Weinerman has acted in the following Israeli TV series:
1989 Ha-Hofesh Ha'Acharon
1997 Florentine
1997 to 2003 Shemesh
1998 to 1999 Only in Israel (season 2)
1998 Parpar Layla

Additionally, she has appeared as herself in the following Israeli TV series:
1999 Parpar Layla
2004 Mishpachat Kamichli

Notes

External links

 

1971 births
Israeli Jews
Israeli female models
21st-century Israeli women singers
Israeli television actresses  
Israeli stage actresses  
Jewish singers
Living people